Turrell may refer to the following people:
Given or middle name
Estelle Turrell Smith (1854–?), American social reformer
Turrell V. Wylie (1927–1984), American scholar, Tibetologist and sinologist

Surname
Edmund Turrell (died 1835), British engraver
James Turrell (born 1943), American artist
Noël Turrell (born 1947), French Olympic biathlete

See also
Turell